Greatest Hits is a compilation of music by Daddy Freddy. It has been released multiple times with a different cover, but same track listing.

Track listing
"Pain Killa"
"Love Sick"
"Ragamuffin Hip Hop"
"Ragga House"
"Keep Talkin'"
"Respect"
"Go, Freddy, Go!"
"Daddy Freddy's In Town"
"London's Finest"
"The Girl Is Fine"
"Respect Due"
"Haul & Pull"
"The Crown"
"Spanish Lingua"
"The Crown"

References

Daddy Freddy albums